The Ngardi, also spelled Ngarti, are an Aboriginal Australian people of the Northern Territory and Western Australia.

Name and grouping
Arthur Capell took the term Ngardi to refer, not to a distinct tribe, but to a branch of the Warlpiri, a point contested by Norman Tindale, who maintained they were distinct.

The Wanjina and Wunggurr spirits are essential elements of the life of the cultural bloc known as the Wanjina Wunggurr, generally consisting of the Worrorra, Wunambal and Ngarinyin peoples of the Kimberley. For the purpose of a mineral rights agreement with a mining company in 2006, the Worrorra were also grouped with the Ngardi, as Dambimangari 
(Dambima-Ngardi), said to share the Wanjina-Wunggurr belief systems. Rock paintings depicting Wanjina, as well as the Gwion Gwion ("Bradshaw") paintings, are evidence of the shared culture.

Country
They were present at Sturt Creek, and the Pallottine Mission area at Balgo Hill. Their southern extension, he adds, went as far as across the mulga scrubland to Milidjipi and Tekkari north of Lake Mackay.

Joint land claim
It was the 11th traditional land claim presented on behalf of Aboriginal traditional owners by the Central Land Council. The land borders on areas in which each of the languages – Ngarti, Warlpiri, and Kukatja – is dominant. People from the different language groups have been influenced by each other when residing at Balgo, Western Australia and Lajamanu, Northern Territory. The claim was presented at Balgo Mission. The recommendation handed down by Justice Sir William Kearney on 23 August 1985 and presented on 19 August 1986 was that "the whole of the claim area be granted to a Land Trust for the benefit of Aboriginals entitled by tradition to its use or occupation, whether or not the traditional entitlement is qualified as to place, time, circumstance, purpose or permission".

Mineral rights agreement

in April 2006, the Aztec Resources (now Mount Gibson Iron) mining company signed a co-existence agreement with the Dambimangari (Dambima/Worrorra-Ngardi)  traditional owners of Koolan Island regarding their iron ore mining operations on the island. The agreement aimed to ensure that 30% of the 220 person workforce is filled by Indigenous people by the eighth year of operation.

Language

The Ngarti people spoke the Ngardi language.

Alternative names

 Bunara, Boonara
 Kolo. (Pintubi exonym)
 Kukuruba (Ngalia exonym)
 Manggai (toponym)
 Munga (?) (cited by R. H. Mathews)
 Ngadi
 Ngari
 Panara. (general term for grass seed winnowing tribes like the Ngarti)
 Puruwantung, Buruwatung
 Waiangara
 Waiangari (Ngalia exonym)
 Waingara, Waiangadi
 Walmala (pejorative)
 Waringari, Warangari. (Warlpiri pejorative for the Ngarti)
 Wommana
 Woneiga, Wanayaga

Source:

See also
Ngururrpa, a grouping of peoples of language groups including Ngardi

Notes

Citations

Sources

Aboriginal peoples of the Northern Territory
Aboriginal peoples of Western Australia